Sabah is a Turkish daily newspaper, with a circulation of around 330,000 as of 2011. Its name means "morning" in Turkish.

The newspaper was founded in İzmir by Dinç Bilgin on 22 April 1985.

In 2007, the government of Turkish Prime Minister Recep Tayyip Erdoğan seized the newspaper, citing a legal document that had not been disclosed to authorities when Sabah was sold in 2001. Ownership of the newspaper was given to the Savings Deposit Insurance Fund of Turkey. Some of the newspaper's staffers were fired, and the paper was then sold to the Turkuvaz Media Group belonging to Çalık Holding whose CEO, Berat Albayrak, is the son-in-law of Erdoğan and whose chairman, Ahmet Çalık, has been described as a "close associate" of Erdoğan. The $1.1bn sale aroused substantial controversy in Turkey, not least because it was partially financed by $750m of loans from two state banks, VakıfBank and Halkbank, and was sold for the minimum price, with Çalık Holding the sole bidder. Before the 2007 seizing, it was a pro-Kemalist, liberal newspaper with its politicial position being close to centre-right.

According to Aslı Aydıntaşbaş, who was Sabah'''s Ankara bureau chief until the takeover, from then on the newspaper took on "an unwavering pro-government line."

The Kalyon Group took over the newspaper in 2013.

Kalyon Group is the current publisher, while Erdal Şafak is the editor-in-chief.Sabah has published The New York Times International Weekly on Sundays since 2009. This 8-page supplement features a selection of articles from The New York Times translated into Turkish. The partnership with The New York Times'' was terminated in 2014 without any formal explanation given.

Notable contributors (past and present) 
Engin Ardıç, journalist

Mehmet Barlas, columnist
Mehmet Ali Birand (1941–2013), journalist

Salih Memecan, cartoonist
Hıncal Uluç, journalist
Didem Ünsal, journalist
Ahmet Vardar (1937–2010), journalist

References

External links
 
Sabah Europe 
Sabah Deutsch 
The newspaper's web site 
https://twitter.com/asliaydintasbas

Turkish-language newspapers
Publications established in 1985
Newspapers published in Istanbul
1985 establishments in Turkey
Daily newspapers published in Turkey